John Rimington MHK was the Minister of Local Government and the Environment of the Isle of Man Government from 2004 to 2006.  He was also Member of the House of Keys between 2000 and 2006 for Rushen, but he was comprehensively defeated in the 2006 general election when he came fifth out of seven candidates in a three-seat constituency.  Prior to being a politician he was a teacher, landscape gardener and computer programmer. He has since taken up a position as a mathematics teacher at Castle Rushen High School in Castletown.

Governmental positions
Minister of Local Government and the Environment, 2004-2006
Minister of Agriculture, Fisheries and Forestry, 2002-2004

References

Members of the House of Keys 1996–2001
Members of the House of Keys 2001–2006
Living people
Year of birth missing (living people)